Raquel Saavedra Salvador (born May 11, 1981, in Barcelona) is a vision impaired S11/B1 swimmer from Spain.  She competed at the 1996 Summer Paralympics, winning a gold medal in the 100 meter backstroke, and a bronze medal in the 4 x 100 meter 49 points medley relay race. She competed at the 2000 Summer Paralympics, earning a bronze in the 100 meter backstroke.

References 

Spanish female backstroke swimmers
Living people
1981 births
Paralympic bronze medalists for Spain
Paralympic gold medalists for Spain
Swimmers from Barcelona
Swimmers at the 2000 Summer Paralympics
Swimmers at the 1996 Summer Paralympics
Paralympic medalists in swimming
Medalists at the 1996 Summer Paralympics
Medalists at the 2000 Summer Paralympics
Paralympic swimmers of Spain
S11-classified Paralympic swimmers